Jayapangus (r. 1178–81) was a king of Bali. He is known through his inscriptions, some of them related to taxes.

Biography
He was a descendant of the famous ruler Airlangga.

Jayapangus was maybe a father of Queen Arjayadengjayaketana. He was her predecessor.

See also
 History of Bali

References

Sources
 Andy Barski, Albert Beaucort and Bruce Carpenter, Barski (2007). Bali and Lombok. Dorling Kindersley, London. .

Monarchs of Bali
Indonesian Hindu monarchs
12th-century monarchs in Asia
12th-century Indonesian people